Andru Donalds (born 16 November 1974) is a Jamaican musician and vocalist, who also worked in collaboration with the Enigma project. Donalds had a hit single in America in 1995 with "Mishale", which reached No. 38 on the Billboard Hot 100.

Biography
Andru Donalds was born in Kingston, Jamaica. His musical style ranges from pop, rock and roll, to reggae and ballads. His influences include Bob Marley, Black Uhuru, The Beatles, Michael Jackson and Prince.

Solo career
After leaving school, Donalds traveled to England, the Netherlands and New York City, to develop his musical abilities as singer and songwriter. He met the producer and songwriter Eric Foster White, who had hits with stars such as Frank Sinatra, Whitney Houston, Julio Iglesias, Backstreet Boys, and Boyzone. Together they produced the debut album Andru Donalds, with the single "Mishale" becoming successful worldwide.

His second album Damned If I Don't was released in 1997. The song "Somebody's Baby" was used for the soundtrack of the Oscar-winning film Good Will Hunting.

Enigma
In 1999 Donalds joined Michael Cretu's Enigma project and was the lead singer on 4 studio albums. Cretu also collaborated with him for Donalds' solo albums Snowin’ Under My Skin and Let's Talk About It. A single from Snowin’ Under My Skin, "All Out of Love" reached platinum status.

Andru also co-wrote and performed on "Distorted Love" and "Je t’aime Till My Dying Day" of Enigma's album Seven Lives Many Faces.

Other collaborations
In 2005 Donalds co-produced and performed the song "And I Feel" for the soundtrack of the German film Barefoot / Barfuß, starring and directed by Til Schweiger.

In 2005 he co-produced with the Ukrainian singer Evgenia Vlasova for the song "Limbo".

Donalds also wrote a song for Sandra, the former wife of Cretu: "The Way I Am", the lead single from her The Art of Love album released in 2007.

Discography

Solo albums
Studio albums
 Andru Donalds (1994)
 Damned If I Don't (1997)
 Snowin' Under My Skin (1999)
 Let's Talk About It (2001)
 Trouble in Paradise (2010)

Compilations
 Best Of (2006)

Singles

Songs with Enigma

Soundtracks

with Eugenia Vlasova
Albums

References

External links
 https://www.facebook.com/andrudonalds

1974 births
Living people
Enigma (German band) members
Jamaican male singers
Reggae fusion artists
Jamaican reggae singers
Jamaican expatriates in Germany